Buchen (South Franconian: Buche) is a town in the German state of Baden-Württemberg. It is situated in the Odenwald low mountain range, 23 km northeast of the regional center Mosbach.

Geography
Buchen is situated on the seam between the south-eastern Odenwald and the Bauland area, along the Upper Germanic-Rhaetian Limes. It lies geographically in the triangle formed by the cities of Mannheim, Würzburg and Heilbronn.  The precincts of the municipality lie in the Natural Park of the Neckar Valley and the Odenwald and in the  Geo-Natural Park of Bergstrasse-Odenwald, at an altitude of between 250 and 500 metres.

Structure of the city
The municipality of Buchen (Odenwald) consists of 14 city areas: Bödigheim, Buchen-City (Buchen-Stadt), Eberstadt, Einbach, Götzingen, Hainstadt, Hettigenbeuern, Hettingen, Hollerbach, Oberneudorf, Rinschheim, Stürzenhardt, Unterneudorf and Waldhausen. The city areas cover the same areas that were occupied by the former townships with the same names, with the exception of the city area called Buchen-Stadt which is officially designated  'Buchen (Odenwald) - .... The city areas are, at the same time, subdivided into 13 residential districts (Wohnbezirke) in terms of the arrangement of municipalities in Baden-Württemberg, whereby the city areas of Buchen-Stadt and Hollerbach are joined together into one residential district. With the exception of the city area of Buchen-Stadt, all city areas contain towns (Ortschaften) in terms of the Baden-Württemberg arrangement of municipalities, each having its own town council (Ortschaftsrat) and provost.

To the city area of Bödigheim belong the village of Bödigheim, the farms of Faustenhof, Griechelternhöfe, Rosshof and Sechelseehöfe and the Sägmühle House. To the city area of Buchen-Stadt belongs the town of  Buchen (Odenwald). To the city areas of Eberstadt, Götzingen, Hettigenbeuern, Hettingen, Hollerbach, Oberneudorf und Stürzenhardt belong all the villages of the same names. To the city area of Einbach belongs the village of Einbach and the farmstead of Einbacher Mühle. To the city area of Hainstadt belong the village of Hainstadt and the land covered by the Hainstadt train station. To the city area Unterneudorf belong the village of Unterneudorf and the house Unterneudorfer Mühle. To the city area of Waldhausen belong the village of Waldhausen the farmstead Gehöft Glashof.

In the city area of Eberstadt lie the deserted medieval towns of Klarenhof and Reinstadt and in the city area of Götzingen the deserted towns of Rönningen and Buklingen.

History
In Roman times, a wall known as the Limes Germanicus was built in the area as a fortification. Many stretches of this wall are still visible today.

Buchen was first mentioned in the Lorscher Codex, the deeds of the Lorsch Monastery, where it appears as Buchheim, and makes a number of donations to the monastery in the year 773. The location was already populated in prehistoric and in Roman times and in Carolingian times it was under the influence of the Amorbach Monastery, the Reeves (Vogt) of which, the Lords of Dürn, held the rights of jurisdiction over Buchen. In the second half of the 13th Century Buchen was given the right to call itself a city. On the fall of the Lords of Dürn, Buchen was sold in 1303/1309 to the Archbishop of Mainz and remained his territory for 500 years. In 1346 Buchen formed the  Federation of Nine Towns ( Neunstädtebund) along with Amorbach, Aschaffenburg, Dieburg, Külsheim, Miltenberg, Seligenstadt, Tauberbischofsheim and Walldürn.

In 1382 the Elector Ruprecht I. failed in an attempt, to break the town during a battle with the Mainz Electorate. The already formidable medieval town fortifications were again strengthened in about 1490 and now even enclosed the western suburbs. During the course of the town's expansion in 1492 the so-called Wartturm on the Wartberg was built higher, and in the same year the so-called Steinerne Bau or ‘Stony Building’ took its place as the seat of the Official belonging to the Electorate of Mainz. The town had early importance as a market town. Alongside the four great Yearly Markets (Shrove Tuesday Market (Fastnachtsmarkt), the May Market, the Jakobi Market und Martin Market) were especially the Yarn, Cloth and Horse Markets as well as the ‘Weekly Market, held every Monday.

During the Peasants' Revolt in 1525 Götz von Berlichingen was forced to become the leader of the Peasant mob in the courtyard of the Steineres Haus ‘the Stony House’ (nowadays the Museumshof). After the defeat of the Peasants the Nine City Federation of the provincial administration was in fact dissolved, and Buchen lost its right to self-government.

In the Thirty Years War the place was now conquered by the Swedes. These had to yield, however, about 1634 royal troops. On this occasion a great fire broke out in the town, in which 153 houses were sacrificed. The church, the Parsonage, the Upper Mill, the Hausener Court and probably the castle was also destroyed here. Further sacrifices had to be suffered with the arrival of famines and epidemics. Out of 215 citizens and 16 Jews only 29 citizens, 5 widows und 26 houses survived. The fields were poisoned.

In 1688 French troops laid siege to the town. When lightning struck in 1717, a catastrophic fire started in the centre of town, with about half of the buildings in the old town falling victim to the conflagration, including the old Town Hall and the Catholic church.

In 1803, after the dissolution of the electorate of Mainz and as a result of decisions made by national deputies, Buchen was assigned to the Principality of Leiningen, which had been resettled on the orders of Napoleon. In 1806 it was then transferred to the Grand Duchy of Baden. In 1815, three of the city towers were torn down and only the western gate was retained (the Mainzer Tor). The Baden Revolution of 1848/49 also found support in Buchen, and some of its citizens burned the records of the Leiningen rent offices. Despite the failure of the revolution, the citizens retained some of the rights they had fought for.

Buchen was already the seat of a district office (Amt) in the Prince Elector Era of Mainz. This position as centre of administrative power kept the city under the rule by Leining and Baden. In 1938 the Bezirk administration of Buchen became the  Landkreis of Buchen.

Eventually leading to the Final Solution all across Germany, on November 9–10, 1938 the Kristallnacht, or November Pogrom, also resulted in synagogues in Buchen and Bödigheim being ransacked, looted and desecrated. After being deported to concentration camps, the 34 inhabitants of Jewish faith who had been living in Buchen as of the 1933 census, at least 13 were killed. The former common cemetery in Bödigheim still bears witness to the earlier life of the Jewish community in the close-knit, surrounding area, which was otherwise predominantly Catholic or Lutheran (Sindolsheim).

During the course of the district reforms in 1973, the county seat of Buchen was dissolved and the city was incorporated into the Neckar Odenwald District.

Incorporation of new areas
Thirteen new localities were incorporated into Buchen as a result of the municipality reforms up to 1975: Stürzenhardt in 1971; Unterneudorf in 1972; Oberneudorf, Bödigheim, Waldhausen and Einbach in 1973; Götzingen, Hainstadt, Hettigenbeuern, Hettingen and Rinschheim in 1974; and, finally, Eberstadt and Hollerbach in 1975. In 1986 the 'Home Days' for Baden-Württemberg took place for the first time.

Politics

The Municipal Council
The local elections of the 13th of June 2004 produced the following results:

Mayor
Since February 2006 Roland Burger has been the mayor of the city of Buchen. He had previously been the mayor of the city of Osterburken (since February 1991). The former mayor of Buchen became a county commissioner (Landrat) for the NOK in Mosbach.

The Coat of Arms
The blazon of the Buchen municipal coat of arms is as follows: Argent (silver), two branches flanking a beech tree growing from the center of a trimount, vert (green), with a leaning shield, gules (red), placed against the trunk, upon which a six-spoked Wheel of Mainz, argent, is placed.

Coats of Arms of the Former Townships

Economy and Infrastructure
Ideally located halfway between the Neckar and Main rivers, Buchen enjoys a favorable geographic location which has allowed it to develop infrastructure and transport connections conducive to production, retail and commercial businesses, the skilled trades and service providers while attracting a highly skilled workforce to the region.

The District Hospital in Buchen serves the whole area, and there are also a number of senior citizens’ assisted living centers. Buchen offered one of the first housing facilities in Germany based on the assisted living concept.

Communications
Buchen can be reached via Bundesautobahn 81, Adelsheim/Osterburken exit, the main road (from the south) or from the Tauberbischofsheim exit, Bundesstrasse 27 (from the north) and also via the A6 by taking the Sinsheim, B292 and B27 exit (from the southwest).

The Buchen (Odenwald) railway station is on the rail line connecting Seckach and Miltenberg (KBS 709, also called the Madonnenlandbahn), which has a further stop at Buchen Ost (Buchen East). Railway services are run by the Westfrankenbahn. Bus service between smaller towns and villages is operated by the Rhein-Neckar-Verkehr GmbH (rnv), which has an extensive network of light rail, tram and bus routes in Mannheim, Heidelberg and Ludwigshafen and the greater region.

Stuttgart Airport and Frankfurt (am Main) Airport are both about 100 km away. The closest airport, for aircraft with a MTOW of 5.7 tons or less, is the Walldürn Airfield. The nearest inland port is Wertheim am Main.

Authorities, courts and public establishments
Buchen is the seat of a local court (Amtsgericht), which belongs to the court circuit  of Mosbach. Furthermore, in Buchen-Hainstadt is the headquarters of the regional office of the Archbishopric of Freiburg for the region of Odenwald-Tauber, to which belong the Deanery of  Mosbach-Buchen and the home of the Bishop of Tauber.

Educational institutions
Buchen has a wide variety of schools, as a result of which many students commute daily to the former county town. There is a technical vocational school, with a high school for those who want to specialize in engineering or information technology; a high school for general education; a technical school for social education; a home economics school; as well as several secondary modern schools, junior schools, primary schools and special schools.

Media
Media in Buchen include:
 Fränkische Nachrichten ("Franconian News"), published in Buchen/Walldürn with Buchen editorial department
 Rhein-Neckar-Zeitung ("Rhine-Neckar Newspaper"), published as Nordbadische Nachrichten with local editorial department and printshop n Buchen

Buchen has a correspondent's office of South-West Broadcasting (Südwestrundfunk) and since 1951 there has been a transmitter for the company (the Buchen-Walldürn transmitter) in the north-west of the city, in Walldürner Straße. Until 1993, the first station of South-West Broadcasting was being broadcast over this transmitter on the middle-wave frequency 1485 kHz, although support for the antenna was a  unharnessed, steel-framed mast that served as a self-beaming mast fed from the nadir and insulated against earthing. In 1993, the medium-wave service was tweaked and the VHF (very high frequency) antenna on its tip was expanded. As a result, it was not only increased in height but also made to cover a greater area. Since there were no more plans to receive the medium wave transmissions, the guy wires of the uppermost level were not provided with isolators.

Culture and sights

Buchen lies on the Siegfriedstraße, a scenic 300-km tourist route originating in Worms, also called the Nibelungen and Siegfried Route  featuring many worthwhile sights.

Theatres
 Productions of the Baden Regional Theatre (Badische Landesbühne)
 The ‘Buchen in concert’ subscription concert series brings leading concert artists to Buchen, from soloists to quartets and symphonies, to perform attractive programming, including one cabaret evening each year

Museums and cultural institutions
 The Regional Museum of Buchen (with the Joseph Martin Kraus Memorial Square)
 The Culture Forum Vis-à-Vis (presenting, among other things, exhibitions of the Neckar-Odenwald Art Society).
 The City Library
 The Adult Education Centre
 The City Joseph Martin-Kraus Music School
 The City Home Library ‘Between the Neckar and the Main“
 The Library of Judaism
 The Hermann Cohen Academy for Religion, Science and Art
 The International Joseph Martin Kraus Society
 The memorial marking the former synagogue
 The City Archives
 The commemorative plaque for the victims of fascism in the old Jewish cemetery, with the names of eight Jewish victims of the Holocaust from Kleineichholzheim
 A memorial plaque at number 35 Vorstadtstrasse, commemorating the destruction of the synagogue during the Nazi regime
 Faschenachtsmuseum – a small display of carnival characters and memorabilia in the Guildhall of the Faschenachtsgesellschaft Narrhalla, tours by previous appointment

The Eberstadt Stalactite Cave

The Eberstadt Stalactite Cave (Tropfsteinhöhle) is approximately 600 yards long and is estimated to be three to five million years old. It has been open to the public for tours since 1973 and is part of the Geo-Naturpark Bergstrasse-Odenwald). The cave contains a wide range of stalactites, including very slender examples and highly conical stalagmites, flags of calc-sinter, terraces of calc-sinter and crystals. Because the cave remained sealed after being discovered and electric lighting has always been used for visitor tours since 1973, the stalactites are generally still as white as chalk, unlike most older German caves that are open to the public where black soot has discolored the stalactites from historical use of open candle and torch flames for lighting.

Further sights and buildings

 The Roman Upper Germanic-Rhaetian Limes, the greatest ground monument in Europe runs round the edge of the city area Walldürn through Buchen, in the direction of Osterburken. Until around the year 260 the Romans used the Limes as a protective wall keeping them safe from the Alamanni and from other Germanic tribes. They built it all the way from Rheinbrohl a distance of 500 km up to the Danube
 One of the original buildings by the architect Egon Eiermann, the annex to the Hotel Prinz Carl built in 1967, in which the rooms and features created by him are still in use (since then it has been ascribed as belonging to the classical modern style)
 Where the present-day town of Bödigheim now stands the knight Wiprecht Rüdt built a castle in the year 1286; at the end of the 16th Century it was upgraded into a Renaissance palace. Between 1712 and 1720 the new Castle (Schloss) of Rüdt von Collenberg was built by Johann Jakob Rischer in Bödigheim
 The ruins of a Jewish Mikveh in Bödigheim
 The Old Town Hall (Hallen-Rathaus) in the centre of the old town
 The Wartberg (on the hill called the Wartberg)

Regular Events
 Fastnacht (Shrove Tuesday Night): the annual 'Faschenacht' festivities in Buchen have attracted thousands of visitors to the area every year for as long as anyone can remember. During the annual 'Fasching' pageant it is compulsory to at least kiss the backside of the symbolic figure, whose origins date back to the Middle Ages, the Buchen Blecker’’.
 Goldener Mai (Golden May) – Live jazz music combos perform at various pubs, restaurants and locales throughout Buchen. On the first Saturday in May of each year (not to be held in 2020 due to the COVID-19 pandemic)
 The Vorsommerfest (Pre-Summer Festival) – Brass bands in the courtyard of the museum (Museumshof) on a weekend in the middle of June – including the Cellerbar ('Zeitmaschine': Time-machine) on Saturday. Organized by the City Band and the Catholic Church Choir (not to be held in 2020 due to the COVID-19 pandemic)
 The Schützenmarkt'' [Marksmens' Club], a traditional regional fair held annually during the first week of September, with market stalls for shopping and amusement rides and food stands (not to be held in 2020 due to the COVID-19 pandemic)
 The Buchen Cult-Night has been "combined" with Golden May on the same weekend in recent years (not to be held in 2020 due to the COVID-19 pandemic)
 OW-ART (Art from the Odenwald), the Odenwald art fair, initiated by the artist Patris Semma and held at the Stadthalle Buchen

Famous Personalities

Sons and Daughters of the City

 13th Century, Albrecht Pilgrim von Buchheim, Minnesinger (mentioned in the Codex Manesse)
 1460, Konrad Wimpina, died 17 May 1531 in Amorbach, Roman Catholic Theologian
 1672, Gottfried Bessel, died 1749 in Göttweig, abbot and scholar
 1765, Marianne Kraus, painter and lady-in-waiting, sister of Joseph Martin Kraus
 1830, 20 May, Wilhelm Emelé, died 11 October 1905 in Freiburg in the Breisgau, German battle painter
 Edmund Lang (1847–1914), Oberamtmann, official
 1866, 24 March, Franz Josef Wittemann, died 10 September 1931 in Karlsruhe, German politician (centre), member of the Landtag (Baden), State President of Baden
 Jacob Mayer (1866-1939), dialect poet
 Pia Bauer (1871–1954), nestor of oncological care in Germany
 1892, 30 June, Wilhelm Schnarrenberger, died 12 April 1966 in Karlsruhe, painter
 1897, 10 July, Ludwig Schwerin, died 2 July 1983 in Ramat Gan, painter
 1950, 21 September Wunibald Müller, German writer and pastoral psychologist
 1952, 5 June, Heinz Fischer-Heidlberger, President of the Bavarian Chief Audit Office
 1965, 17 September, Ulrike Ballweg, Co-trainer of the German Women's National Football Team

Other personalities, who worked in Buchen
 Joseph Martin Kraus, (1756–1792), a leading court composer in Stockholm and contemporary of Mozart
 Juliana von Stockhausen (1899–1998), writer
 Marshall Prentice (1919–1976), LSO officer of the Military Government responsible for Buchen district 1948–49, Honorary Citizen of Buchen (1949), senator of the Fasenachtsgesellschaft Narrhalla Buchen, street named in his honor in 2017: Marshall-Prentice-Straße

External links

 Buchen, the city's official internet site.
 Bezirksmuseum Buchen, The official web-presence of the Buchen County Museum  (Bezirksmuseum Buchen)
 Buchen, description and illustration of the historical Buchen on a private website
 Schloss Bödigheim- Illustrated presentation of the complex, an abbreviated history of the Baron Rüdt von Collenberg, the relations of the present occupiers and how it is currently used on the website of the Freiherrlich Rüdt von Collenberg Castle Society.
 Synagogue, History of Jewish Life in the incorporated residential quarters ('Stadteile'/boroughs) of Buchen   and Eberstadt on the Alemannia Judaica website, a working group for research into the history of Jewish life and culture in southern Germany and neighbouring regions.

References

Neckar-Odenwald-Kreis
Holocaust locations in Germany
Baden